The 1932–33 League of Ireland was the twelfth season of the League of Ireland. Shamrock Rovers were the defending champions.

Dundalk won their first title, becoming the first team from outside Dublin to do so.

Overview
Two teams were not re-elected to the League (Brideville and Jacobs), while Waterford resigned voluntarily. Only one new team was elected (Cork Bohemians), resulting in the League reducing in size from twelve teams to ten.

Teams

Table

Results

Top goalscorers

See also 

 1932–33 FAI Cup

Ireland
Lea
League of Ireland seasons